Melaleuca apodocephala is a plant in the myrtle family, Myrtaceae and is endemic to the south-west of Western Australia. It is a low, bushy shrub with crowded, grey-green leaves, corky bark and a profusion of creamy-yellow flowers on the sides of the branches.

Description
Melaleuca apodocephala sometimes grows to a height of  but often much less. The ends of the leaves are pointed without being prickly.

The flowers are  creamy-white with yellow stamens, arranged in roughly spherical clusters along the branches. The stamens are in five bundles around the flower and there are 6-13 stamens per bundle. Over time the clusters become embedded in the corky branches.

Taxonomy and naming
Melaleuca apodocephala was first formally described in 1852 by Nikolai Turczaninow in "Bulletin de la classe physico-mathematique de l'Academie Imperiale des sciences de Saint-Petersburg". The specific epithet (apodocephala) is from the latinised Greek apodus meaning "sessile" and -cephalus meaning "headed", referring to the sessile fruiting capsules.

Distribution and habitat
This melaleuca occurs in and between the Stirling Range and Scaddan districts in the Esperance, Mallee and Swan Coastal Plain biogeographic regions. It grows in sand, rocky clay, loam on limestone cliffs, in saline depressions, dunes and swales.

Conservation status
Melaleuca apodocephala is classified as "not threatened" by the Government of Western Australia Department of Parks and Wildlife.

References 

apodocephala
Myrtales of Australia
Plants described in 1852
Endemic flora of Western Australia
Taxa named by Nikolai Turczaninow